Hoseyn Sadani (also Romanized as Ḩoseyn Sādanī) is a village in Baghak Rural District, in the Central District of Tangestan County, Bushehr Province, Iran. At the 2006 census, its population was 179, in 37 families.

References 

Populated places in Tangestan County